

Wales
 David Astley – Metz – 1946–47
 Brynley Griffiths – Sète, FC Nancy – 1952–57, 1958–59
 William Arthur Hayward – Fives – 1932–33
 Aaron Ramsey – Nice – 2022–
 Joe Rodon – Rennes – 2022–

References and notes

Books

Club pages
AJ Auxerre former players
AJ Auxerre former players
Girondins de Bordeaux former players
Girondins de Bordeaux former players
Les ex-Tangos (joueurs), Stade Lavallois former players
Olympique Lyonnais former players
Olympique de Marseille former players
FC Metz former players
AS Monaco FC former players
Ils ont porté les couleurs de la Paillade... Montpellier HSC Former players
AS Nancy former players
FC Nantes former players
Paris SG former players
Red Star Former players
Red Star former players
Stade de Reims former players
Stade Rennais former players
CO Roubaix-Tourcoing former players
AS Saint-Étienne former players
Sporting Toulon Var former players

Others

stat2foot
footballenfrance
French Clubs' Players in European Cups 1955-1995, RSSSF
Finnish players abroad, RSSSF
Italian players abroad, RSSSF
Romanians who played in foreign championships
Swiss players in France, RSSSF
EURO 2008 CONNECTIONS: FRANCE, Stephen Byrne Bristol Rovers official site

Notes

France
 
Association football player non-biographical articles